Gin and juice is a fruity cocktail made from gin (preferably of the English brand Tanqueray) and fruit juice, with simple syrup added for additional sweetness.

In popular culture 
The gin and juice has inspired the popular hip hop song "Gin and Juice" by Snoop Dogg, Snoop Dogg's most-streamed (on Spotify) song from his 1993 debut album Doggystyle. The lyrics to the song "California Gurls" by Katy Perry has a reference to the drink with the lyrics in question: "Sippin' gin and juice / Laying underneath the palm trees". The lyrics of the song "Hands to Myself", by Selena Gomez, also makes reference to it.
Kiss Me More by Doja Cat (feat. SZA) also makes a reference to the drink: "taste breakfast, lunch, and gin and juice". The song "Ballad of Herman Dune (High on Rye & Lost at Sea)" by the group "Herman Dune" also makes reference to the drink: "I use to dream of the LBC. Watching Snoop Dogg in the MTV. Now I miss my youth and I miss my tooth. But I'm cruising and sipping on Gin&Juice".
On Miranda Lambert's 2022 album Palomino, the song "Scenes" (co-written by Lambert and songwriters Natalie Hemby & Luke Dick) includes the line "Got a gin and juice at the Satellite Inn."

References

Cocktails with gin
Fruity cocktails